Victor Rackets Industrial Corporation (stylized as VICTOR) is a Taiwanese manufacturer of sporting equipment with products ranging from badminton and squash rackets, sportswear, shoes, shuttlecocks, and other equipment for the sport. Its products are among the ones approved by Badminton World Federation for international tournaments.

History
Victor was founded in 1968 by Chen Den Li (陳登立), producing badminton shuttlecocks which in two years topped the sales in Taiwan. It expanded its distribution to Europe after Guido Schmidt started the distribution with VICTOR Sport Vertriebs GmbH as the trademark rights holder for the continent. In 1992, Victor opened its production center in Nanjing, China.

Sponsorships
Victor supplies official materials for the following badminton athletes, teams, or associations:

National teams
  Denmark national badminton team

Associations
 Badminton Oceania

Brand ambassadors
 Zhao Jianhua
 Wang Shixian
 Li Jinhui

Players

  Anders Antonsen
  Lee Zii Jia
  Tai Tzu-ying
  Wang Tzu-wei
  Hendra Setiawan
  Mohammad Ahsan
  Praveen Jordan
  Melati Daeva Oktavianti
  Greysia Polii
  Apriyani Rahayu
  Siti Fadia Silva Ramadhanti
  Ashwini Ponnappa
  Kirsty Gilmour

References

External links
Official Website
Badminton Racket
Badminton shoes

1968 establishments in Taiwan
Sportswear brands
Taiwanese brands
Manufacturing companies based in Taipei
Sporting goods manufacturers of Taiwan
Badminton equipment manufacturers
Golf equipment manufacturers
Manufacturing companies established in 1968